The Iza is a left tributary of the river Tisa in northern Romania. Its source is in the Rodna Mountains. It flows into the Tisa near the city Sighetu Marmației. It passes through the communes Săcel, Săliștea de Sus, Dragomirești, Bogdan Vodă, Șieu, Rozavlea, Strâmtura, Bârsana, Oncești, Vadu Izei, and Sighetu Marmației.

Tributaries
The following rivers are tributaries to the river Iza:

Left: Valea Carelor, Bistrița, Bâleasa, Baicu, Slatina, Ieud, Gârbova Mare, Botiza, Sâlța, Slătioara, Valea Morii, Văleni, Mara, Șugău
Right: Valea Satului, Valea Muntelui, Valea Caselor, Valea Porcului, Rona

References

Rivers of Romania
 
Rivers of Maramureș County